Monroe Township is one of twenty townships in Allen County, Indiana, United States. At the 2010 census, the population was 1,927.

Geography

Cities, towns, villages
 Monroeville

Unincorporated towns
 East Liberty at 
(This list is based on USGS data and may include former settlements.)

Adjacent townships
 Jackson Township (north)
 Benton Township, Paulding County, Ohio (northeast)
 Tully Township, Van Wert County, Ohio (east)
 Union Township, Adams County (south)
 Root Township, Adams County (southwest)
 Madison Township (west)
 Jefferson Township (northwest)

Four Presidents Corners, a monument, was built in 1917 where Monroe Township meets with Jackson, Madison, and Jefferson townships. All four townships are named after presidents.

Cemeteries
The township contains these four cemeteries: Brown, Hoffman, Odd Fellows and Sugar Ridge.

Major highways

School districts
 East Allen County Schools

Political districts
 Indiana's 3rd congressional district
 State House District 79
 State Senate District 14

References

Citations

Sources
 United States Census Bureau 2008 TIGER/Line Shapefiles
 United States Board on Geographic Names (GNIS)
 IndianaMap

Townships in Allen County, Indiana
Fort Wayne, IN Metropolitan Statistical Area
Townships in Indiana